Edgar Nathaniel Sarratt III (born June 5, 2003), known professionally as midwxst is an American singer and rapper from Indianapolis, Indiana. He is signed to Geffen Records. His extended play, Better Luck Next Time., was released in March 2022.

Early life 
Sarratt was born in Columbia, South Carolina. His father works in the Air Force, and his mother works as a human resources executive. He has one sister and he was diagnosed with ADHD when he was young. He attended Park Tudor School for High School.

Musical style and influences 
Sarratt's musical style has been described as hyperpop. He grew up listening to Kanye West, TLC, Aaliyah, and Beyoncé from his mother, while his father listened to hip hop. Sarratt cites Tyler, the Creator, Frank Ocean, XXXTentacion, Porter Robinson, and Pi'erre Bourne as music influences.

Discography

Extended plays

Singles

As lead artist

Music videos
2020
 "Tysm"
 "Long Time Interlude"
2021
 "Trying"
 "Vivid"
 "Ruthless"
 "Made It Back"
 "Tic Tac Toe"
 "All Talk"
 "LA" (featuring Ka$hdami)
 "Slide" (featuring Slump6s & Ericdoa)
 "Care"
 "Bluffing"
2022
 "Riddle"
 "I Know You Hate Me"
 "Step Back"
 "Switching Sides"
 "On My Mind"
 "Sidelines"
 "Broken"
 "223's" (featuring BabyTron)
 "Mad"
2023
 "Tally" (with Denzel Curry)

References

External links 
 

2003 births
Living people
21st-century American rappers
American male rappers
Midwest hip hop musicians
Rappers from Indiana
21st-century American singers
21st-century American male singers
American male pop singers
American hip hop singers
Pop rappers
Geffen Records artists
Singers from Indiana
People from South Carolina
Singers from South Carolina
People from Indiana